Melody Island is an island on Stillwater Reservoir in Herkimer County, New York. It is located southeast of Stillwater.

References

Islands of New York (state)
Islands of Herkimer County, New York